The Special Tasks Unit (SUV) is a special operations unit of the National Armed Forces. It was established in September 1991. The unit is specially organized, trained and equipped for the performance of high-danger tasks. The soldiers in the unit continuously train to enhance their professional preparedness and are provided with specialized equipment in order to carry out their tasks efficiently. Their motto is "The brave man wins" (Latvian: Drošais Uzvar).

Structure 

 Headquarters
 Staff Company
 Combat Squadron A
 Combat Squadron B
 Combat Squadron C
 Combat Support Squadron
 Training Squadron

The Special Tasks Unit consists of trained professional soldiers who are specialized in certain areas (e.g. airborne troops, combat divers, snipers, dog handlers and other).

Mission 
The unit is developed in a way, which allows it to provide assistance to state security and law-enforcement institutions in counter-terrorist operations and perform special tasks within the entire range of military operations: defense, attack and detention operations, airborne, sea landing and underwater operations, operations in a special environment (built-up territories, forests, limited visibility conditions, mountains, arctic and cold weather conditions, deserts and hot weather conditions), as well as search and rescue operations in collaboration with the Naval and Air Forces.

The main mission of The Special Tasks Unit is to:
Perform special operations for national defense and security interests;
Participate in counter-terrorist operations;
Perform search and rescue operations on land and sea.

Equipment 

The Special Tasks Unit's equipment are bullet proof vests knee, elbow padding and a ballistic/tactical helmet and the Guns are Heckler & Koch MP5, Heckler & Koch G36, Steyr AUG, Glock 17, M249 SAW, L96A1, and many other weapons.

References

National Armed Forces site

Special forces units and formations
Military units and formations of Latvia
Military units and formations established in 1991
1991 establishments in Latvia